The 2012 ICC World Twenty20 was the fourth ICC World Twenty20 competition, an international Twenty20 cricket tournament that took place in Sri Lanka from 18 September to 7 October 2012 which was won by the West Indies. This was the first World Twenty20 tournament held in an Asian country, the last three having been held in South Africa, England and the West Indies. Sri Lankan pacer Lasith Malinga had been chosen as the event ambassador of the tournament by ICC. The format had four groups of three teams in a preliminary round.

Match fixtures were announced on 21 September 2011 by ICC. On the same date, the ICC also unveiled the logo of the tournament, named "Modern Spin".

Background
The 2012 World Twenty20 is the fourth edition of the Twenty20 tournament. The first was hosted by South Africa in 2007, where India beat Pakistan in a thriller to become Twenty20 champions. Pakistan, the losing finalists in 2007, defeated Sri Lanka in 2009 tournament to become World T20 Champions, held in England. In 2010 England became the third World Twenty20 champions by beating Australia in the West Indies.

Format
The format is the same as the 2010 edition. The format has four groups of three in a preliminary round, groups A-D. In addition to the ten test cricket playing nations, there are two associate/affiliate teams who qualified from the 2012 ICC World Twenty20 Qualifier staged in the United Arab Emirates on 13–14 March 2012.

The top two teams from each group A-D proceed to the Super Eight stage of the tournament. The Super Eights consist of two groups 1 & 2. The top two teams from the Super Eight groups play the semi-finals, and the semi-final winners contest the final to determine the world champions in Twenty20 cricket. England are the defending champions, having won the 2010 edition in the West Indies.

The Super Eight stage consists of the top two teams from each group of the group stage. The teams are split into two groups, Groups 1 and 2. Group 1 will consist of the top seed from Groups A and C, and the second seed of groups B and D. Group 2 will consist of the top seed from Groups B and D, and the second seed of groups A and C. The seedings used are those allocated at the start of the tournament and are not affected by group stage results, with the exception of if a non-seeded team knocks out a seeded team, the non-seeded team inherits the seed of the knocked-out team.

During the group stage and Super Eight, points are awarded to the teams as follows:

In case of a tie (i.e. both teams score exactly the same number of runs at the end of their respective innings), a Super Over decides the winner. This is applicable in all stages of the tournament.

Within each group (both group stage & Super Eight stage), teams are ranked against each other based on the following criteria:
 Higher number of points
 If equal, higher number of wins
 If still equal, higher net run rate
 If still equal, lower bowling strike rate
 If still equal, result of head-to-head meeting.

Qualification

Earlier, the ICC development committee had expanded the global qualification system for the World Twenty20, to give the Associate and Affiliate members of the governing body a chance to feature in the tournament. The qualification tournament, which was contested by eight teams in February 2010, featured 16 sides when it was held in early 2012 ahead of the World Twenty20 in Sri Lanka, later that year.

Ireland defeated Afghanistan in the final to win the championship which was a rematch of the 2010 ICC World Twenty20 Qualifier. Both teams progressed to play in the 2012 ICC World Twenty20.

Venues
All matches were played at the following three grounds:

Match officials

Umpires

Referees

Squads

Groups
The groups were announced on 21 September 2011.

Group A
 A1
 A2
 Q2

Group B
 B1
 B2
 Q1

Group C
 C1
 C2

Group D
 D1
 D2

Fixtures and results

There were 27 matches played during the 2012 ICC World Twenty20, 12 in group stages, 12 in Super Eights, two Semi-finals and a final.

All times given are Sri Lanka Standard Time (UTC+05:30)

Warm-up matches

12 warm-up matches were played between 13 and 19 September featuring all 12 teams.

Group stage

Group A

Group B

Group C

Group D

Super 8s 

Seedings for this stage were allocated at the start of the tournament and were not affected by group stage results, with the exception that if a non-seeded team knocked out a seeded team, it would inherit that team's seeding.

Group 1

Group 2

Knockout stage

Semi-finals

Final

Statistics

Most Runs

Most Wickets

Team of the tournament

Media coverage

See also
 2012 ICC Women's World Twenty20

References

External links

 
2012 in Sri Lankan cricket
ICC Men's T20 World Cup
International cricket competitions in 2012–13
Cricket